Michael Osborne (born 29 July 1982) is a former Australian rules football coach and player who most recently served as a development coach with the Carlton Football Club in the Australian Football League (AFL). in 2014 and 2015 before opening The Australian Rules Football College (ARFC) with premiership teammate Brad Sewell. As a player, he played with the Hawthorn Football Club.

In 2016, he was assistant coach at Balwyn in the EFL where the club won their 4th premiership in 5 years under the tenure of Daniel Donati.

Overview
Recruited from Labrador, Queensland, Osborne debuted for Hawthorn Football Club in 2001 after being elevated from the rookie list. He played in the Box Hill Hawks's 2001 premiership team that year. While only playing three games in his first two seasons, since 2003 Osborne was a regular selection when not injured. A versatile player Osborne could play as a small defender, midfielder or forward. In 2005, he was awarded the club's 'defensive pursuits player of the year'. In 2008 Osborne played in 20 of the 22 home-and-away games, and was part of Hawthorn's premiership team and finished 5th in the Peter Crimmins Medal.

Osborne suffered a season-ending ACL injury in Round 7 of the 2012 season. He was delisted at the end of the 2012 season, but was redrafted with pick 70 in 2012 draft. Hawthorn recruitment manager Graeme Wright said: "It's great to have 'Ossie' back on the list officially. He was very gracious in helping us from a list management point of view. We were able to get Jonathan Simpkin onto the list as a delisted free agent by delisting 'Ossie'."

He played 5 senior games in 2013, spending most of the season with Hawthorn's affiliate VFL side Box Hill.

Osborne announced his retirement at Hawthorn's 2013 Best and Fairest count.

Immediately after his playing days were over, he joined Carlton as a development coach on 27 November 2013.

In March 2016, Osborne, along with ex-teammate Brad Sewell, launched the Australian Rules Football College. Based in North Melbourne, and based on a US college model, the Australian Rules Football College focuses on developing the football skills of their students, whilst also placing an emphasis on education, through offering certificates in health, personal training, massage, leadership, management and diplomas in business.

Statistics

|- style=background:#EAEAEA
| 2001 ||  || 40
| 2 || 1 || 0 || 3 || 3 || 6 || 2 || 2 || 0.5 || 0.0 || 1.5 || 1.5 || 3.0 || 1.0 || 1.0 || 0
|-
| 2002 ||  || 40
| 1 || 1 || 0 || 4 || 3 || 7 || 3 || 0 || 1.0 || 0.0 || 4.0 || 3.0 || 7.0 || 3.0 || 0.0 || 0
|- style=background:#EAEAEA
| 2003 ||  || 40
| 19 || 3 || 3 || 169 || 64 || 233 || 62 || 40 || 0.2 || 0.2 || 8.9 || 3.4 || 12.3 || 3.3 || 2.1 || 0
|-
| 2004 ||  || 40
| 17 || 1 || 0 || 106 || 54 || 160 || 50 || 28 || 0.1 || 0.0 || 6.2 || 3.2 || 9.4 || 2.9 || 1.6 || 0
|- style=background:#EAEAEA
| 2005 ||  || 7
| 19 || 8 || 3 || 166 || 91 || 257 || 76 || 49 || 0.4 || 0.2 || 8.7 || 4.8 || 13.5 || 4.0 || 2.6 || 0
|-
| 2006 ||  || 7
| 4 || 3 || 4 || 31 || 28 || 59 || 10 || 8 || 0.8 || 1.0 || 7.8 || 7.0 || 14.8 || 2.5 || 2.0 || 0
|- style=background:#EAEAEA
| 2007 ||  || 7
| 14 || 8 || 7 || 103 || 64 || 167 || 60 || 19 || 0.6 || 0.5 || 7.4 || 4.6 || 11.9 || 4.3 || 1.4 || 0
|-
| bgcolor=F0E68C | 2008# ||  || 7
| 23 || 27 || 10 || 235 || 179 || 414 || 134 || 46 || 1.2 || 0.4 || 10.2 || 7.8 || 18.0 || 5.8 || 2.0 || 1
|- style=background:#EAEAEA
| 2009 ||  || 7
| 17 || 14 || 9 || 146 || 116 || 262 || 73 || 46 || 0.8 || 0.5 || 8.6 || 6.8 || 15.4 || 4.3 || 2.7 || 0
|-
| 2010 ||  || 7
| 20 || 17 || 10 || 156 || 103 || 259 || 79 || 55 || 0.9 || 0.5 || 7.8 || 5.2 || 13.0 || 4.0 || 2.8 || 0
|- style=background:#EAEAEA
| 2011 ||  || 7
| 20 || 21 || 10 || 172 || 109 || 281 || 80 || 57 || 1.1 || 0.5 || 8.6 || 5.5 || 14.1 || 4.0 || 2.9 || 0
|-
| 2012 ||  || 7
| 7 || 3 || 6 || 45 || 43 || 88 || 20 || 14 || 0.4 || 0.9 || 6.4 || 6.1 || 12.6 || 2.9 || 2.0 || 0
|- style=background:#EAEAEA
| 2013 ||  || 7
| 5 || 3 || 0 || 29 || 20 || 49 || 15 || 13 || 0.6 || 0.0 || 5.8 || 4.0 || 9.8 || 3.0 || 2.6 || 0
|- class="sortbottom"
! colspan=3| Career:
! 168 !! 110 !! 62 !! 1365 !! 877 !! 2242 !! 664 !! 377 !! 0.7 !! 0.4 !! 8.1 !! 5.2 !! 13.3 !! 4.0 !! 2.2 !! 1
|}

Honors and achievements
Team
 AFL premiership player: 2008
 2× Minor premiership: 2012, 2013
 2× VFL premiership player: 2001, 2013

Individual
 AFL Rising Star nominee: 2003
 Australian international rules football team: 2008
 Box Hill Hawks All-Stars team (1999–2019)
  life member

References

External links
 

Australian rules footballers from Queensland
Sportspeople from the Gold Coast, Queensland
Hawthorn Football Club players
Hawthorn Football Club Premiership players
Box Hill Football Club players
Labrador Australian Football Club players
1982 births
Living people
Australia international rules football team players
One-time VFL/AFL Premiership players